Derrick Norval Walker (born June 23, 1967) is a former American football player.  He played college football for the University of Michigan as a tight end and inside linebacker from 1986 to 1989.  He played professional football as a tight end in the National Football League (NFL) for nine seasons with the San Diego Chargers (1990-1993), the Kansas City Chiefs (1994-1997), and the Oakland Raiders (1998).

Early years
Walker was born in Glenwood, Illinois, in 1967.  He attended Bloom High School in Chicago Heights, Illinois.

University of Michigan
Walker enrolled at the University of Michigan in 1985 and played college football for head coach Bo Schembechler's Michigan Wolverines football teams from 1986 to 1989. After redshirting in 1985, he played at the inside linebacker position in 1986.  He was converted to a tight end in 1987 and won Michigan's Frederick Matthei Award.

As a junior, Walker started two games, one at tight end and one at split end.  As a senior, he was a team co-captain and started all 12 games at tight end for the 1989 Michigan Wolverines football team that compiled a 10–2 in Schembechler's last season as Michigan's head coach. At the end of the 1989 season, Walker was selected as the first-team tight end on the 1989 All-Big Ten Conference football team. He caught 33 passes for 446 yards and five touchdowns during his time at Michigan.

Professional football
Walker was selected by the San Diego Chargers in the sixth round (163rd overall pick) of the 1990 NFL Draft.  Walker became the Chargers' starting tight end from 1990 to 1993. He appeared in 60 games, 55 as a starter, and caught 98 passes for 979 yards and four touchdowns.

Walker joined the Kansas City Chiefs for the 1994 NFL season.  In four seasons with the Chiefs from 1994 to 1997, Walker appeared in 58 games, 28 as a starter, and caught 75 passes for 720 yards and four touchdowns.  He concluded his playing career with the Oakland Raiders during the 1999 NFL season.  He appeared 11 games, three as a starter, for the Raiders and caught seven passes for 71 yards.

In nine NFL seasons, Walker appeared in 129 regular season games and caught 180 passes for 1,770 yard and nine touchdowns. He also appeared in five playoff games and 10 passes for 127 yards and a touchdown.

Later years
After retiring from football, Walker lived in West Bloomfield, Michigan. In 2007, he was hired as a sports broadcaster for the Big Ten Network.  He was married to Rhonda Walker, a news anchor on Detroit's WDIV-TV, but the two later divorced.

In July 2012, Walker sued the NFL alleging that the league failed to warn him about the risk of football-related concussions.

References

1967 births
Living people
Sportspeople from Cook County, Illinois
American football tight ends
San Diego Chargers players
Kansas City Chiefs players
Oakland Raiders players
Michigan Wolverines football players
People from West Bloomfield, Michigan
Ed Block Courage Award recipients